Advanced Language & Academic Studies (ALAS) High School is part of the Milwaukee Public Schools district in Milwaukee, Wisconsin. As of 2016 it had 247 students with a Student Radial Diversity Index of 13%. Most students speak the Spanish language  as their First language (although lessons are taught in both the Spanish language and the English language).

References

External links
Advanced Language & Academic Studies

Education in Milwaukee
High schools in Milwaukee